"Under the Weather" is an alternative rock song performed by Scottish singer-songwriter KT Tunstall. The song was written by Tunstall and TommyD and produced by Steve Osborne for Tunstall's debut album Eye to the Telescope (2004). It was released as the album's fourth single on 5 December 2005. The song reached No. 39 on the UK Singles Chart, remaining on the chart for two weeks.

Formats and track listings
These are the formats and track listings of major single releases of "Under the Weather".

CD single
"Under The Weather" (Single Version)
"Tangled Up in Blue" (BBC Four Live Version)

Vinyl single
"Under the Weather" (single version)
"Little Favours"

Promo CD
"Under the Weather" (Radio Version) 3:14
"Under the Weather" (Instrumental) 3:28

Release details

Notes

2005 singles
KT Tunstall songs
Songs written by KT Tunstall
2004 songs
Relentless Records singles